Richard Ballantine (25 July 1940 – 29 May 2013) was a cycling writer, journalist and cycling advocate. Born in America, the son of Ian and Betty Ballantine of Ballantine Books, and educated at the Browning School in New York and Columbia University, he principally resided in London, England. He is most famous for his 1972 Richard's Bicycle Book and its subsequent editions. He was also an editor at Rufus Publications (founded by his parents) and founded several magazines including Bicycle magazine.

Richard's Bicycle Book 
Ballantine's Richard's Bicycle Book, first published in 1972, appeared at a time when cycling was experiencing a resurgence in popularity due in part to the oil shortages of the world oil crisis and the appearance of lightweight road bicycles. The book was a cornucopia of cycling-related information; it not only contained an overview of the history of the bicycle, explanations of differing bicycle designs and types and various bicycle accessories, guides to basic bicycle maintenance and fitting among others, but was heavily laced with the author's own views and humour to boot.

The Bicycle Book also introduced many new cyclists to the world of commuting and bicycle touring and was also an early example of bicycle advocacy. In a section on road cycling, commuting, and etiquette, Ballantine firmly stated his view that cyclists, as lawful road users, had an absolute right to share existing roads, and that the safe travel of all users should take precedence in designing new streets and thoroughfares.

The book was dedicated to "Samuel Joseph Melville, hero".

Over the years, Richard's Bicycle Book has been through several incarnations such as Richard's New Bicycle Book (1987) and  Richard's 21st Century Bicycle Book (2000).

Ballantine and the HPV movement 
Ballantine was prominent in the human powered vehicle movement from its inception in the 1980s and active in the HPV racing movement.

He was chairman of the British Human Power Club and of the World Human Powered Vehicle Association.

Personal 
He was married and had three children.

Bibliography 
 City Cycling (2007)
 Living Ultimate Bicycle Book, DK Living, with Richard Grant (2000)
 Richard's 21st Century Bicycle Book (2000)
 Ultimate Bicycle Book, with Richard Grant (1998)
 Bicycle Repair Manual (1994)
 Cyclist's Britain (1989)
 Richard's New Bicycle Book (1987)
 Richard's Bicycle Book (1972)

References

External links 
Richard Ballantine articles on BikeReader
INTERVIEW: Richard Ballantine | Bicycle business | Interviews by BikeBiz

1940 births
2013 deaths
American expatriate sportspeople in England
American information and reference writers
Columbia University alumni
Cycling journalists
Cycling advocates
Cycling writers
Ballantine family
Browning School alumni